Eospilarctia is a genus of tiger moths in the family Erebidae. It was erected by Nobutoyo Kôda in 1988. The moths are found in east Asia.

Taxonomy
The genus needs in a scientific review. Some species and subspecies are still not described.

Species 
 Eospilarctia chuanxina (Fang, 1982)
 Eospilarctia fangchenglaiae Dubatolov, Kishida & Min, 2008
 Eospilarctia formosana (Rothschild, 1933)
 Eospilarctia guangdonga Dubatolov, Kishida & Wang, 2008
 Eospilarctia huangshanensis Fang, 2000
 Eospilarctia lewisii (Butler, 1885)
 Eospilarctia maciai Saldaitis et al., 2012
 Eospilarctia nehallenia (Oberthür, 1911)
 Eospilarctia nehallenia baibarensis (Matsumura, 1930)
 Eospilarctia naumanni Saldaitis et al., 2012
 Eospilarctia neurographa (Hampson, 1909)
 Eospilarctia pauper (Oberthür, 1911)
 Eospilarctia taliensis (Rothschild, 1933)

Subgenus Pareospilarctia Dubatolov & Kishida, 2008 
 Eospilarctia yuennanica (Daniel, 1943)

References

Spilosomina
Moth genera